Battenberg or Battenburg may refer to:

Places
 Battenberg (Eder), a town in Hesse, Germany
 Battenberg, Rhineland-Palatinate, a town in Rhineland-Palatinate, Germany

 Battenberg Hill, in the South Shetland Islands, Antarctica

People
 Battenberg family, German noble family from Hesse
 Julia, Princess of Battenberg (1825–1895)
 Prince Louis of Battenberg (1854–1921)
 Princess Marie of Battenberg (1852–1923)
 Prince Alexander of Battenberg (1857–1893)
 Prince Henry of Battenberg (1858–1896)
 Prince Francis Joseph of Battenberg (1861–1924)
 Princess Alice of Battenberg (1885–1969)
 John Nelson Battenberg (1931–2012), American sculptor

Other uses
 Battenberg cake or Battenburg cake, a cake with a checkered pattern on the inside
 Battenburg markings, a pattern named after the aforementioned cake
 Battenberg Cup, an American naval award (named after Prince Louis of Battenberg)

See also
 Mountbatten, UK branch of the German family
 Mountbatten-Windsor, the personal surname of some of the descendants of Queen Elizabeth II and Prince Philip, Duke of Edinburgh
 Battenberg Mausoleum, mausoleum of Prince Alexander of Battenberg in Sofia, Bulgaria
 Battenberg Palace, the popular name of the Rousse Regional Historical Museum building
 Battenberg Chapel, in St Mildred's Church, Whippingham, on the Isle of Wight
 Battenberg Square, central square in Sofia, Bulgaria (named after Prince Alexander of Battenberg)